Aubry Percy Owens (January 29, 1896 – January 1963) was an American Negro league baseball pitcher in the 1920s.

A native of Vicksburg, Mississippi, he attended Alcorn A&M College. He made his Negro League debut in 1922 with the Chicago American Giants, and played with them for four seasons. He died in 1963 at age 66 or 67.

References

External links
 and Seamheads

1896 births
1963 deaths
Date of death missing
Place of death missing
Chicago American Giants players
20th-century African-American sportspeople
Baseball pitchers